Laura Jean McLaughlin (December 27, 1965) is an American ceramic sculptor, print maker, and mosaic artist. Her collaborative mosaics can be found around Pittsburgh and the surrounding areas. She has been awarded several residencies including three from the Kohler Co. in Wisconsin.

Early life

McLaughlin is one of twelve children born to Eileen Welsh and Robert E. McLaughlin in Pittsburgh, Pennsylvania on December 27, 1965. She grew up in Shaler Township, attending and graduating from Shaler High School. She attended Indiana University of Pennsylvania from 1984–89, where she received her B.S. in Medical Technology and minored in Art, Biology, and Chemistry. She moved to Chapel Hill, North Carolina where she worked in a hospital lab until continuing her higher education in August 1992, when she moved to Morgantown, West Virginia and attended West Virginia University College of Creative Arts from 1992–95. There is where she received her M.F.A. in ceramics with a concentration in printmaking and sculpture and earned her K-12 Art Teaching Certification.

Selected exhibitions 
 18 Hands Gallery, “Penland Through the Years”, Houston, Texas, 2011
 Panza Gallery, “Flying”, Pittsburgh, Pennsylvania, 2011
 Sherrie Gallerie, June Gallery Hop, Columbus, Ohio, 2013
 Penland Gallery, Penland, North Carolina, 2014
 Andy Warhol Museum, Benefit Auction, Pittsburgh, Pennsylvania, 2014
 Chautauqua Institution Gallery, 5 person exhibition “Naked”, Chautauqua, New York, 2015
 Morgan Contemporary Glass Gallery, Group exhibition, Pittsburgh, Pennsylvania, 2015
 Lascaux Gallery, “Past. Present. Future”, Chelsea, New York, NY, 2016
 BE Gallery, Pittsburgh, Pennsylvania, 2017
 Pittsburgh Center for the Arts, Pittsburgh, Pennsylvania, 2017

Public arts
McLaughlin has been commissioned to create and install collaborative mosaics in and around Pittsburgh, PA since 2004.

References

External links
 Website

1965 births
Living people
Artists from Pittsburgh
West Virginia University alumni